Sduduzo Ka-Mbili aka Nunu was born in Engonyameni, a rural area of Durban, South Africa. In 1989, he first attended a Shell Corporation sponsored Dance and Drama Program at the University of Natal, where he first learnt about professional performing. He joined Phenduka Dance Theatre, where he received contemporary dance training from Alfred Hinkel   from Cape Town.

As a performer in S.A., Sduduzo worked in Mbongeni Ngema’s Sarafina (The Movie), starring Whoopi Goldberg, Poison Musical by David Kramer and Taliep Peterson, Soweto Dance Theatre, directed by late Jackie Semela, Free Flight Dance Company, under the direction of Adele Blank and Christopher Kindo. In 1997, Sduduzo was one of the three recipients for a full scholarship to train at the Alvin Ailey American Dance School in New York City. During his training in NYC, he was given an opportunity to create a piece (Izinhlungu Zami, My Sorrow) for the Alvin Ailey Repertory Dance Ensemble, which he later performed for the company. In 1999, he toured the US with Donald Byrd’s Harlem Nutcracker before establishing a song and dance JUXTAPOWER production, representative of the South African culture. Juxtapower eventually developed into a touring production that travelled extensively throughout the USA.

In 2003, Sduduzo was nominated as ‘One of the 25 to Watch’ by DANCE MAGAZINE. His work as choreographer, teacher and dancer has been reviewed by the New York Times,   Washington Past, Village Voice,  and Rolling Stone magazine

He has also shared the same stage with Alicia Keys, Bono, Gwen Stefani, Sheryl Crow, Jay Z, David Bowie, Talib Kweli and many more.  In 2008, he was invited by Russell Simons’ Foundation and Hearst (Magazine company) to feature at their high-profile event which was attended by the likes of Gayle King from O’ Magazine, Russell and Run Simmonsw. His production, together with the Lion King cast also paid tribute to the legendary film maker and photographer Gordon Parks, just before his passing. Sduduzo travelled extensively throughout the European Union regions, performing and teaching about his history and culture. In June 2008, he was invited to headline a United Nation’s Africa Day event, which was also attended by dignitaries from all over the world. He was also featured in the NBC TV show "Super Stars of Dance "in 2008, as a representative of South Africa.

He has produced productions in New York and created shows for colleges, schools, and special events across America. While studying in college, Sduduzo Ka-Mbili was introduced to Radio Broadcasting, which changed his life. He is now a radio talk-show host and producer of ‘No Questions Asked-Izigqi Zezizwe’ on New York’s WBAI-FM radio station..

Sduduzo is also a founding member of the ANC-US Interim Branch in New York, which is a social movement representing the rights and interests of South Africans, residing abroad. Sduduzo holds a Bachelor of Science degree from Empire State College in NY. He is a Masters Candidate for a Social-Public Policy degree at SUNY.Sduduzo Ka-Mbili has recently written his first novel ‘ENIGOR and the Crystal Children’, due out in July 2012.

References

South African male dancers
South African choreographers
Living people
Contemporary dancers
People from Durban
Year of birth missing (living people)